Pap Ndiaye is a French historian and government minister. He was a professor at the School for Advanced Studies in the Social Sciences and then, since 2012, at Sciences Po. Since 20 May 2022, he has served as Minister of National Education and Youth in the government of Prime Minister Élisabeth Borne.

As an academic, he focused on transnational philosophies of race that draw both from American and French political thought, especially as they apply to the African diaspora populations of both countries.

His appointment to the government by President Emmanuel Macron drew criticisms from the far-right and parts of the traditional right.

Background and education
Ndiaye was born in Antony, Hauts-de-Seine, south of Paris, to a Senegalese father and a French mother. His sister is the writer Marie NDiaye, winner of the 2009 Prix Goncourt (she spells their surname with two uppercase letters, whereas he spells it with one).

Ndiaye graduated from the École normale supérieure de lettres et sciences humaines in 1986, and obtained the Agrégation in history. Ndiaye obtained his PhD in history from the School for Advanced Studies in the Social Sciences. From 1991 to 1996, Ndiaye conducted research in the United States as preparation for a thesis about the history of the petrochemical corporation DuPont. As the son of a Senegalese father and a French mother, he has credited his time at the University of Virginia with exposing him to themes of racism in the United States that prompted his interest in seriously studying the topic.

Career
Upon returning to France, Ndiaye became a lecturer at the School for Advanced Studies in the Social Sciences. The focus of his research agenda became understanding the history of racially discrimatory practices in France and in America. He was one of the first researchers in France to compare the history of the African diaspora in France and in the United States. Together with Patrick Lozès, the future president of the Representative Council of France's Black Associations, Ndiaye co-founded the Action Committee for the Promotion of Diversity in France.

In 2012, Ndiaye became a faculty member at Sciences Po. He has been a member of the Centre d'études nord-américaines (Center for North American studies) and has been an editor of the journal L'Histoire. He has also published pieces in the news media.

In February 2021, Ndiaye was made director of the French national museum of immigration (the Palais de la Porte Dorée, Musée national de l'histoire de l'immigration and Aquarium tropical).

In May 2022, he was designated the new Minister of National Education and Youth by President Emmanuel Macron in Prime Minister Élisabeth Borne's government. Ndiaye had previously been a critic of Macron, stating in 2019: "it is difficult to discern a policy, or even a consistent point of view".

His surprise appointment came with widespread criticism from the far-right, Marine Le Pen, Jordan Bardella, and Éric Zemmour, but also some people from Les Républicains. The weekly Marianne presented him as "the importer of black studies in France" and called his positioning an "ambivalence". In 2017, Ndiaye had comments on structural racism in France, explaining that according to him there is racism in the State, which can be found in some institutions like Police, but it's not a racism from the State In a 2021 interview with Le Monde, Ndiaye stated he did not experience racism growing up in France and only "realised that [he] was black" when he was 25 while studying in the United States.

A poll conducted towards 1002 persons in the late summer 2022 by CSA for CNews found that 62% of respondents (24% not at all, 38% rather not) did not trust Ndiaye to fulfil his duties as Education Minister.

Selected works
Du nylon et des bombes: DuPont de Nemours, le marché et l'État américain (Of nylon and bombs: Dupont de Nemours, the market and the American state), 2001
La Condition noire (The Black condition), 2008
Les Noirs américains : en marche pour l'égalité (Black Americans: On the march for equality), 2009
 Histoire de Chicago, Paris, Fayard, 2013 (avec Andrew Diamond)
Les Noirs américains: De l'esclavage à Black Lives Matter, 2021

Selected awards
Jean-Michel Gaillard Award (2008)
Knight of the Legion of Honour (2021)

References

1965 births
Living people
People from Antony, Hauts-de-Seine
French people of Senegalese descent
20th-century French historians
21st-century French historians
Lycée Lakanal alumni
Lycée Henri-IV alumni
University of Virginia alumni
Academic staff of Sciences Po
School for Advanced Studies in the Social Sciences alumni
Academic staff of the School for Advanced Studies in the Social Sciences
French Ministers of National Education
Chevaliers of the Légion d'honneur
Black French politicians
Members of the Borne government